Jihua Park Station, formerly Lujing Lu Station during planning, is a metro station on the Guangfo Line (FMetro Line 1) on the Guangzhou Metro. It is also planned to be an interchange station between Guangfo Line (FMetro Line 1) and FMetro Line 4. It is located under Fenjiang South Road south of its junction with Yingyin Road in the Chancheng District of Foshan, near Jihua Park. The station is situated in the financial and business centre of Foshan. It was completed on 3 November 2010.

Station layout

Exits

References

Foshan Metro stations
Railway stations in China opened in 2010
Guangzhou Metro stations